England at the 2006 Commonwealth Games were represented by the Commonwealth Games Council for England (CGCE). The country went by the abbreviation ENG and used the St George's Cross as flag and Land of Hope and Glory as the national anthem.

Diver Tony Ally bore England's flag at the opening ceremony whilst shooter Mick Gault bore the flag during the closing ceremony, both chosen by a vote of England team managers from a list of nominations.

Expectations
England entered these Games, held in Melbourne; Australia, after playing hosts to the previous Games in Manchester in Manchester 2002. The medal tally was not expected to be a large as at the 2002 Games, where England had a home advantage and achieved a total of 166 medals including 54 Gold, 51 Silver and 60 Bronze to finish in second place behind Australia. A strong second place in the medal tally was, however, still expected.

The country sent a large team, with competitors taking part in every sport in the schedule. The largest teams were sent in athletics and swimming and it was in these sports, along with cycling and shooting that the team hoped to win most medals. Though there were medal hopes across most sports.

Medals

Medallists

Silver
Athletics:
Martyn Bernard, Men's High Jump
Natasha Danvers, Women's 400 m Hurdles
Joanne Pavey, Women's 5000 m
Emma Ania, Anyika Onuora, Laura Turner & Kim Wall, Women's 4 × 100 m Relay

Badminton:
Mixed Team

Boxing:
Darran Langley, Light Flyweight 48 kg

Cycling:
Rob Hayles, Men's 4000 m Individual Pursuit
Victoria Pendleton, Women's 500 m Time Trial
Jason Queally, Men's 1 km Time Trial
Oli Beckinsale, Men's Mountain Bike
Men's Team Sprint

Diving:
Peter Waterfield, Men's 10 Platform
Men's Synchronised 3 m Springboard

Gymnastics:
Shavahn Church, Women's Uneven Bars
Women's Artistic Team

Lawn Bowls:
Men's Pairs

Rugby Sevens:
Men's

Shooting:
Mike Babb, Men's 50 m Rifle Prone
Mick Gault, Men's 50 m Pistol
Rachel Parish, Women's Double Trap
Patel Parag, Open Full Bore
Men's 10 m Air Pistol Pairs
Men's 25 m Centre Fire Pistol Pairs
Men's Skeet Pairs
Women's 50 m Rifle Prone Pairs

Squash:
Vicky Botwright & James Willstrop, Mixed Doubles

Swimming:
Simon Burnett, Men's 200 m Freestyle
Rebecca Cooke, Women's 400 m Individual Medley
James Gibson, Men' 100 m Breaststroke
Joanne Jackson, Women's 400 m Freestyle
Melanie Marshall, Women's 200 m Backstroke
Darren Mew, Men's 50 m Breaststroke
Liam Tancock, Men's 50 m Backcrawl
Men's 4 × 100 m Medley Relay
Women's 4 × 100 m Freestyle Relay
Women's 4 × 100 m Medley Relay
Women's 4 × 200 m Freestyle Relay

Synchronised Swimming:
Jenna Randall, Synchronised Swimming Solo

Table Tennis:
Andrew Baggaley & Andrew Rushton, Men's Doubles

Weightlifting:
Jason Irving, Open EAD Powerlifting

Bronze
Athletics: 
Jessica Ennis, Women's Heptathlon
Stephen Lewis, Men's Pole Vault
Dan Robinson, Men's Marathon
Lorraine Shaw, Women's Hammer
Andrew Turner, Men's 110 m Hurdles
Nadia Williams, Women's Triple Jump
Mara Yamauchi, Women's 10000 m
Elizabeth Yelling, Women's Marathon

Badminton:
Robert Blair & Anthony Clark, Men's Doubles
Gail Emms & Donna Kellogg, Women's Doubles

Basketball:
Men's basketball
Women's basketball

Boxing:
Neil Perkins, Welterweight 69 kg
James Degale, Middleweight 75 kg

Cycling: 
Stephen Cummings, Men's Individual Pursuit
Emma Jones, Women's Individual Pursuit

Diving:
Women's Synchronised 3 m Springboard

Gymnastics:
Becky Downie, Women's Beam
Men's Artistic Team

Hockey:
Women's Hockey

Lawn Bowls:
Women's Triples

Netball:
Women's Netball

Shooting:
Pinky Le Grelle, Women's Skeet
Men's 50 m Pistol Pairs
Men's 50 m Rifle 3 Positions Pairs
Men's Double Trap Pairs
Women's 10 m Air Pistol Pairs

Squash:
Lee Beachill, Men's Singles
Tania Bailey & Vicky Botwright, Women's Doubles

Swimming:
Terri Dunning, Women's 200 m Butterfly
Melanie Marshall, Women's 200 m Freestyle
Melanie Marshall, Women's 100 m Backstroke
Matthew Benedict Walker, Men's 50 m EAD Freestyle

Table Tennis:
Catherine Mitton, Women's Singles EAD

Athletics

Team England sent a team of 89 athletes to compete in the Commonwealth Games Athletics meet. The team won 18 medals at the 2006 Commonwealth Games Athletics Meet ; six gold, four silver and eight bronze.

Men
Track

Q : Qualified for next round
DNS : Did not start race
DNF : Did not finish race
DSQ : Disqualified
EAD (T12) : event for athlete with a disability (sight impaired category)

Field

Q : Qualified for final

Combined events

Women
Track

{|class=wikitable style="font-size:90%"
|-
!rowspan="2"|Athlete
!rowspan="2"|Events
!colspan="2"|Heat
!colspan="2"|Semifinal
!colspan="2"|Final
|-
!Result
!Rank
!Result
!Rank
!Result
!Rank
|-
|Emma Ania
|100m
|align="center"|11.44
|align="center"|6 Q
|align="center"|11.45
|align="center"|8 Q
|align="center"|11.51
|align="center"|8
|-
|Joanna Ankier
|3000m steeplechase
|align="center" colspan="4" bgcolor="honeydew"|
|align="center"|9:53.12
|align="center"|7
|-
|Tina Brown
|3000m steeplechase
|align="center" colspan="4" bgcolor="honeydew"|
|align="center"|10:09.14
|align="center"|8
|-
|Helen Clitheroe
|1500m
|align="center"|1:11.05
|align="center"|7 Q
|align="center" colspan="2" bgcolor="honeydew"|
|align="center"|4:06.81
|align="center"|4
|-
|Natasha Danvers-Smith
|400m hurdles
|align="center"|55.47
|align="center"|2 Q
|align="center" colspan="2" bgcolor="honeydew"|
|align="center"|55.17
|align="center"|
|-
|Lisa Dobriskey
|1500m
|align="center"|4:10.02
|align="center"|3 Q
|align="center" colspan="2" bgcolor="honeydew"|
|align="center"|4:06.21
|align="center"|
|-
|Donna Fraser
|400m
|align="center"| DNS
|align="center"| –
|align="center" colspan="4"|did not advance
|-
|Natalie Harvey
|5000m
|align="center" colspan="4" bgcolor="honeydew"|
|align="center"|15:51.94
|align="center"|9
|-
|Johanna Jackson
|20km walk
|align="center" colspan="4" bgcolor="honeydew"|
|align="center"|1:42:04
|align="center"|7
|-
|Debra Mason
|Marathon
|align="center" colspan="4" bgcolor="honeydew"|
|align="center"|DNF
|align="center"| –
|-
|Niobe Menendez
|20km walk
|align="center" colspan="4" bgcolor="honeydew"|
|align="center"|1:47:35
|align="center"|8
|-
|Christine Ohuruogu
|400m
|align="center"|51.97
|align="center"|3 Q
|align="center"|50.87
|align="center"|1 Q
|align="center"|50.28
|align="center"|
|-
|Marilyn Okoru
|800m
|align="center"|2:05:01
|align="center"|15 'Q|align="center"|2:00:84
|align="center"|4 Q|align="center"|2:01.65
|align="center"|7
|-
|Anyika Onuora
|100m
|align="center"|11.59
|align="center"|15 Q|align="center"|11.46
|align="center"|9
|align="center" colspan="2"|did not advance
|-
|Jo Pavey
|5000m
|align="center" colspan="4" bgcolor="honeydew"|
|align="center"|14:59.08
|align="center"|
|-
|Julie Pratt
|100m hurdles
|align="center"|13.49
|align="center"|8 Q|align="center" colspan="2" bgcolor="honeydew"|
|align="center"|13.48
|align="center"|6
|-
|Nicola Sanders
|400m hurdles
|align="center"|55.76
|align="center"|4 Q|align="center" colspan="2" bgcolor="honeydew"|
|align="center"|55.32
|align="center"|4
|-
|Jemma Simpson
|800m
|align="center"|2:03.49
|align="center"|5 Q|align="center"|2:01.78
|align="center"|8 Q|align="center"|2:01.11
|align="center"|6
|-
|Laura Turner
|100m
|align="center"|11.43
|align="center"|4 Q|align="center"|11.38
|align="center"|4 Q|align="center"|11.46
|align="center"|4
|-
|Kimberly Wall
|400m
|align="center"|53.05
|align="center"|13 Q|align="center"|53.75
|align="center"|19
|align="center" colspan="2"|did not advance
|-
|Shelley Woods
|800m EAD (T54)
|align="center" colspan="4" bgcolor="honeydew"|
|align="center"|1:58.92
|align="center"|7
|-
|Mara Yamauchi
|10000m
|align="center" colspan="4" bgcolor="honeydew"|
|align="center"|31:49.40
|align="center"|
|-
|Hayley Yelling
|10000m
|align="center" colspan="4" bgcolor="honeydew"|
|align="center"| 32:32.38
|align="center"|6
|-
|Liz Yelling
|Marathon
|align="center" colspan="4" bgcolor="honeydew"|
|align="center"|2:32:19
|align="center"|
|-
|Nwnyika OnouraKimberly WallLaura TurnerEmma Ania
|4 × 100 m relay
|align="center" colspan="4" bgcolor="honeydew"|
|align="center"| 43.43
|align="center"|
|-
|Christine OhuruoguNicola SandersNatasha Danvers-SmithKimberly Wall
|4 × 400 m relay
|align="center" colspan="4" bgcolor="honeydew"|
|align="center"|DSQ
|align="center"| –
|}

 Q : Qualified for next round
 DNF : Did not finish
 DNS : Did not start
 DSQ : Disqualified
 EAD (T54) : Events for athletes with a disability (wheelchair racing category)

Field

Combined events

 Badminton

Singles and Doubles events

Mixed Team Event

Basketball

Men's tournament
Pool Classification

Pool Matches Pool B Knockout MatchesSemifinalBronze Medal MatchWomen's tournament
Pool Classification

Pool Matches Pool B Knockout MatchesSemifinalBronze Medal MatchBoxing

 RSC : referee stopped contest
 RET : retired (hurt)
 WO : walkover

Cycling

 Road

 DNF : did not finish

 Track

 QG – qualified for Gold Final
 QB – qualified for Bronze Final

Mountain bike

Diving

Men

  	   	

 1 m: Ben Swain, Peter Waterfield
 3 m: Ben Swain, Tony Ally
 10 m: Peter Waterfield, Gareth Jones, Leon Taylor
 3 m synchro: Tony Ally/Mark Shipman
 10 m synchro: Callum Johnstone/Gary Hunt, Peter Waterfield/Leon Taylor

Women
 1 m: Tandi Indergaard
 3 m: Rebecca Gallentree, Hayley Sage, Tandi Indergaard
 10 m: Sarah Barrow, Stacie Powell, Tonia Couch
 3 m Synchro: Tandi Indergaard/Hayley Sage
 10 m Synchro: Stacie Powell/Tonia Couch, Brooke Graddon/Sarah Barrow

Field hockey

Men's tournament

 Richard Alexander
 Jon Bleby
 Jonty Clarke
 Scott Cordon
 Matt Daly
 Jon Ebsworth
 James Fair
 Brett Garrard
 Adam Rebbeck
 Ben Hawes
 Martin Jones
 Glenn Kirkham
 Simon Mantell
 Ben Marsden
 Barry Middleton
 Rob Moore
 James TindallHead coach: Jason Lee

Women's tournament

 Jennie Bimson
 Melanie Clewlow
 Crista Cullen
 Alex Danson
 Becky Duggan
 Joanne Ellis
 Cathy Gilliat-Smith
 Helen Grant
 Charlotte Hartley
 Beckie Herbert
 Carolyn Reid
 Helen Richardson
 Chloe Rogers
 Beth Storry
 Kate Walsh
 Rachel Walsh
 Lisa Wooding
 Lucilla WrightHead coach: Danny Kerry

Gymnastics

 Artistic
Men
 Ryan Bradley
 Ross Brewer
 Luke Folwell
 Louis Smith
 Kristian Thomas

Women
 Beth Tweddle (Team captain, withdrew due to injury)
 Imogen Cairns
 Shavahn Church
 Hannah Clowes
 Becky Downie

Rhythmic
 Hannah Chappell
 Rachel Ennis
 Heather Mann

Lawn bowls

Men
 Mark Bantock
 Ian Bond
 Stephen Farish
 Mervyn King
 Robert Newman
 Andy Thomson

Women
 Jean Baker
 Ellen Falkner
 Susan Harriott
 Katherine Hawes
 Amy Monkhouse
 Catherine Popple

Netball

England's netball team qualified for the event by being in the top six of the IFNA world rankings.
 Women only team event – 1 team of 12 players

Roster
Ama Agbeze, Karen Atkinson, Louisa Brownfield, Jade Clarke, Pamela Cookey, Rachel Dunn, Chioma Ezeogu, Geva Mentor, Sonia Mkoloma, Olivia Murphy (captain), Naomi Stenhouse, Abby Teare, Margaret Caldow (head coach)

Group play

Semi-final

Bronze medal match

Rugby sevens

 Simon Amor (Captain)
 Danny Care
 Ben Gollings
 Richard Haughton
 Magnus Lund
 Nils Mordt
 Henry Paul
 Ben Russell
 David Seymour
 Mathew Tait
 Tom Varndell
 Andy Vilk

Shooting

Men
 Clay target:
 Skeet: Richard Brickell, Clive Bramley
 Trap: Christopher Dean, Edward Ling
 Double trap: Richard Faulds, Steve Walton
 Pistol:
 10 m air pistol: Mick Gault, Nick Baxter
 25 m centre fire: Peter Flippant, Simon Lucas
 25 m standard pistol: Mick Gault, Simon Lucas
 50 m pistol: Mick Gault, Nick Baxter
 Small bore rifle:
 10 m: air rifle: Chris Hector, Chris Lacey
 50 m rifle 3 positions: Chris Hector, Jason Burrage
 50 m: rifle prone: Mike Babb, Chris Hector

Women
 Clay Target:
 Skeet: Elena Little, Pinky Le Grelle
 Trap: Lesley Goddard
 Double trap: Charlotte Kerwood, Rachel Parish
 Pistol:
 10 m air pistol: Georgina Geikie, Julia Lydall
 25 m sports pistol: Georgina Geikie, Julia Lydall
 Small bore rifle:
 10 m air rifle: Louise Minett, Becky Spicer
 50 m rifle 3 positions: Louise Minett, Becky Spicer
 50 m rifle prone: Sharon Lee, Helen Spittles

Open
 Full Bore: Queens Prize: Glyn Barnett, Parag Patel

Squash

Men
 Lee Beachill
 Adrian Grant
 Nick Matthew
 Peter Nicol
 James Willstrop

Women
 Tania Bailey
 Vicky Botwright
 Jenny Duncalf
 Linda Elriani
 Alison Waters

Swimming

Men
 Matthew Bowe
 Simon Burnett
 Matthew Clay
 Chris Cook
 Chris Cozens
 Ross Davenport
 Mark Foster
 James Gibson
 Anthony Howard
 Darren Mew
 Dean Milwain
 Alex Scotcher
 Liam Tancock
 Matt Walker EAD

Women
 Julia Beckett
 Rosalind Brett
 Rebecca Cooke
 Terri Dunning
 Francesca Halsall
 Kate Haywood
 Joanne Jackson
 Melanie Marshall
 Keri-anne Payne
 Kate Richardson
 Katy Sexton
 Amy Smith

Synchronised swimming

 Olivia Allison
 Jenna Randall
 Lauren Smith

Table tennis

Men
 Andrew Baggaley
 Alan Cooke
 Paul Drinkhall
 Andrew Rushton
 Sean Sweeting
 Jack Donohoe

Women
 Helen Lower
 Joanna Parker
 Kelly Sibley
 Georgina Walker
 Sue Gilroy EAD
 Cathy Mitton EAD
 Jane Campbell EAD
 Catherine Perry
 Michael Barrett

Men's Team EventPool CWomen's Team EventPool B'''

 England are eliminated at the pool stage.

Triathlon

Men

Women

Weightlifting

Men

Men – EAD (Powerlifting)

Women

See also
 Commonwealth Games Council for England
 England at the 2002 Commonwealth Games

References

External links
 2006 Commonwealth Games Council for England website
 BBC Sports – a full list of England's competitors at the 2006 Games in Melbourne

Nations at the 2006 Commonwealth Games
2006
2006 in English sport